Frank Lovece is an American journalist and author, and a comic book writer primarily for Marvel Comics, where he and artist Mike Okamoto created the miniseries Atomic Age. His longest affiliation has been with the New York metropolitan area newspaper Newsday, where he has worked as a feature writer and film critic.

Early life
Born in Buenos Aires, Argentina, the son of Italian immigrants, Frank Lovece moved to the U.S. as a toddler and was raised in Keyser and Morgantown, West Virginia. There his family ran Italian restaurants. He attended St. Francis High School and West Virginia University in Morgantown, where he was the arts/entertainment editor of the college newspaper, the Daily Athenaeum. He graduated with a  Bachelor of Arts in Communications.

Career

Early work
Together with the editors of Consumer Guide, Lovece wrote TV Trivia: Thirty Years of Television, published in 1984. This was followed by Hailing 'Taxi': The Official Book of the Show (1988) and similar books on topic including the TV series The Brady Bunch and The X-Files. By 1990, Lovece had become a writer and film critic for Newsday. In the 1990s, he wrote for Entertainment Weekly. He produced the first home video (footage of his own child) in 1991 to obtain an MPAA rating for an Entertainment Weekly article on how to have home movies rated. He also wrote an unofficial book guide for Godzilla, but after Godzilla franchise owner Toho filed a lawsuit, a district court judge in 1998 issued a preliminary injunction blocking the book from release in the United States due to alleged trademark violation. The book was published in Europe with no issues.

Comic books
Lovece and artist Mike Okamoto created the four-issue miniseries Atomic Age (Nov. 1990 – Feb. 1991) for Marvel Comics' creator-owned Epic Comics imprint.

Lovece wrote for Nightstalkers, Hokum & Hex and other Marvel titles, and his and artist Bill Koeb's story "For My Son" in the anthology series Clive Barker's Hellraiser appears in the Checker Publishing book Clive Barker's Hellraiser: Collected Best.

Lovece edited the graphic novel Stan Lee's God Woke, which was written by Stan Lee and Fabian Nicieza. It won the 2017 Independent Publisher Book Awards' Outstanding Books of the Year Independent Voice Award.

Later career
Lovece has created websites for magazines and television shows and written articles for, among others, Habitat, Entertainment Weekly, Newsday, Yahoo!/MSN.  

In 2005, Lovece and photographer Matthew Jordan Smith collaborated on the book Lost and Found, a photojournalistic record of families of abducted children and the work of The National Center for Missing & Exploited Children.

Lovece has been a movie critic for Film Journal International, the TV Guide website, and the northern New Jersey newspaper The Record.

Bibliography
 Lovece, Frank. TV Trivia: Thirty Years of Television (1984) New York: Beekman House / Publications International. 
 Lovece, Frank, with Jules Franco. Hailing Taxi: The Official Book of the Show (1988) New York: Prentice Hall Press , 
Reissued and updated: Taxi: The Official Fan's Guide (1996) New York: Citadel Press , 
 Edelstein, Andrew J., and Frank Lovece. The Brady Bunch Book (1990) New York: Warner Books. 
Lovece, Frank (1992). The Television Yearbook. New York: Perigee Books / Putnam Publishing. , 
Lovece, Frank.  The X-Files Declassified (1996) New York: Citadel Press. , 
U.K. edition: The X-Files Declassified : The Truth!: The Unauthorized Guide to the Complete Series (1996) London: Hodder & Stoughton. , 
Lovece, Frank.  Godzilla: The Complete Guide to Moviedom's Mightiest Monster. Originally scheduled 1998 by William Morrow / Quill. ; . Subjected to prior restraint in U.S.; released overseas.
Smith, Michael Jordan (photographer), and Frank Lovece. Lost and Found (2006) New York: Filipacchi Publishing. ,

References

External links

American comics writers
American humorists
American male journalists
Living people
People from Buenos Aires
People from Keyser, West Virginia
People from Morgantown, West Virginia
Argentine emigrants to the United States
American people of Italian descent
Marvel Comics people
1958 births